WEOA (1400 AM) is a radio station licensed to and serving the Evansville, Indiana market.  The transmitter is located near the interchange of I-69 and Weinbach Avenue in Evansville.

History
1400 AM originally was WEOA (Evansville On the Air) then changed to WROZ, a Top 40 station in the 1960s with top personalities such as Charlie Shoe, Jack Etzel, Mark Clark, Steve Walling, and Johnny Carr, and country music in the 1970s and 1980s with top personalities: Tiny Hughes and Jim Embry. After WROZ left, 1400 became a simulcast of then WJPS-FM (now WLFW 93.5).

In 1997, a group of African American investors approached South Central Communications about leasing the frequency for an urban contemporary format. South Central agreed. For 10 years, WEOA would be the only urban station in the Evansville area until August 2007 when CHR/Pop WDKS shifted to Urban. The local marketing agreement with BLS Entertainment lasted until 2009, when BLS bought the station outright for $175,000.

On March 19, 2018, WEOA changed its format from urban adult contemporary to urban contemporary, branded as "98.5 WEOA".

Current programming
WEOA runs the ABC Radio's syndicated Tom Joyner Morning Show and the ABC Touch Urban AC feed, although they do locally program some hours of hip hop, notably on Friday and Saturday nights.

See also
WROZ

References

External links
FCC History Cards for WEOA

Urban contemporary radio stations in the United States
EOA
Radio stations established in 1936
1936 establishments in Indiana